Aleksandr Alekseyevich Minayev (born 20 August 1958, died 12 March 2010) was a Russian professional football player and coach.

Playing career
He made his professional debut in the Soviet Second League in 1976 for FC Volga Gorky. He played 4 games in the UEFA Cup 1994–95 for FC Tekstilshchik Kamyshin. Minayev played only for one club abroad, a season in Yugoslavia with Serbian side FK Budućnost Valjevo.

Death
He died in March 2010 in Voronezh.

References

1958 births
People from Skovorodinsky District
2010 deaths
Soviet footballers
Russian footballers
Association football midfielders
Association football defenders
Russian Premier League players
Russian football managers
PFC Krylia Sovetov Samara players
FC Torpedo Moscow players
FC Fakel Voronezh players
FC Tekstilshchik Kamyshin players
FC Metallurg Lipetsk players
FK Budućnost Valjevo players
Expatriate footballers in Yugoslavia
FC Volga Nizhny Novgorod players
Sportspeople from Amur Oblast